NordStar, officially JSC NordStar Airlines is a Russian airline based in Norilsk. Its main base is Alykel Airport.

History 
NordStar was founded by Norilsk Nickel and was launched on 17 December 2008, based on local Taimyr Peninsula airlines.

NordStar operated its first flight on 17 June 2009, from Norilsk to Moscow Domodedovo and Krasnoyarsk. 
 
On 25 March 2022 Norilsk Nickel announced that NordStar was sold to airline management.

Codeshare Agreements 
S7 Airlines 
Utair

Destinations

Fleet

, the NordStar fleet consists of the following aircraft:

References

External links

 Official website 

Airlines established in 2010
Airlines of Russia
Charter airlines
Companies based in Krasnoyarsk
Russian brands